The Women's 10,000 metres event took place on July 7, 2011, at the Kobe Universiade Memorial Stadium.

Medalists

Records

Results

Final
The race was held at 19:25 local time.

References

10,000 metres
10,000 metres at the Asian Athletics Championships
2011 in women's athletics